Matigarahat is a village  in the Matigara CD block in the Siliguri subdivision of the Darjeeling district in the state of West Bengal, India.

Geography

Location                     

Area overview
The map alongside shows the Siliguri subdivision of Darjeeling district. This area is spread across the foothills of the Himalayas and is a plain land gently sloping from north to south. While the northern part is mentioned as the Terai region, the larger southern portion forms the western part of the Dooars region. While 55.11% per cent of the population resides in the rural areas, 44.89% resides in the urban areas. On the western side the Mechi River forms a long border with Nepal. On the eastern side the Mahananda River forms a short border with Bangladesh.

Note: The map alongside presents some of the notable locations in the subdivision. All places marked in the map are linked in the larger full screen map.

Demographics
According to the 2011 Census of India, Matigarahat had a total population of 4,710 of which 2,413 (51%) were males and 2,297 (49%) were females. There were 654 persons in the age range of 0 to 6 years. The total number of literate people in Matigarahat was 2,781 (59.04% of the population over 6 years).

Civic Administration

Police station
Matigara police station has jurisdiction over the Matigara CD block.

Transport

There is station at Matigara on the Katihar-Siliguri line.

Education
Matigara Harasundar High School is a Bengali-medium coeducational institution established in 1959. It has facilities for teaching from class V to class XII.

References

Villages in Darjeeling district